William F. McLaughlin (born 1932) was an American politician from the State of Michigan.

McLaughlin resided in St. Clair Shores and Northville, Michigan.  Prior to working as a party operative McLaughlin had an insurance business.  He was a candidate for the Michigan State House of Representatives from Macomb County 2nd District in 1962 and a delegate to Republican National Convention from Michigan in 1964.  

He was Vice-chairman of the Michigan Republican Party in 1965 and later elected Chairman of the Michigan Republican Party from 1969-1979 tying Gerrit J. Diekema for ten consecutive years of service.

References 
 The Political Graveyard

Michigan Republican Party chairs
Michigan Republicans
People from Northville, Michigan
People from St. Clair Shores, Michigan
Living people
1932 births